is a Japanese professional footballer who plays as a midfielder. He currently play for J1 League club, Sanfrecce Hiroshima.

Club career
Kawamura was born in Hiroshima Prefecture on August 28, 1999. He joined J1 League club Sanfrecce Hiroshima from youth team in 2018.

He was loaned to J2 League club, Ehime FC for 2019 season. He left from the club after two years at Ehime.

After leave the club, Kawamura return to Hiroshima for 2022 season. On 22 October 2022, Kawamura brought his club reach first title of J. League Cup after defeat Cerezo Osaka with dramatic score 2-1.

Club statistics
.

Honours

Club
Sanfrecce Hiroshima
 J.League Cup: 2022

References

External links

Profile at Sanfrecce Hiroshima

1999 births
Living people
Association football people from Hiroshima Prefecture
Japanese footballers
J1 League players
J2 League players
Sanfrecce Hiroshima players
Ehime FC players
Association football midfielders